Yakshi is a Malayalam novel written by Malayattoor Ramakrishnan in 1967. The novel follows a college lecturer, Srinivasan, who is disfigured in an accident in his college lab. He meets a beautiful woman who is willing to accept him despite his disfigurement. But after a while, Srinivasan begins to doubt that the woman is all she appears - or even human. In 1968, the novel was adapted into a film with same name starring Sathyan. In 1993, Yakshi was shown in BBC's Off the Shelf program as 12 episodes. In 1995, Hema Malini directed a telefilm in Hindi for Zee TV titled Mohini with Sudesh Berry and Madhoo. In 2013, a contemporary retelling of the novel titled Akam was released.

Plot

Yakshi narrates the story of Srinivasan, a young handsome scientist and lecturer who is working in a college in Kerala. Srinivasan is doing research on the Yakshis (Vampire). He is in love with one of the students at the college, Vijayalakshmi.

In the chemistry laboratory, he is met with an unexpected accident, leaving almost half of his face damaged. Everyone who used to adore him begins to hate him and avoids him because of his looks. Even Vijayalakshmi deserts him. He is thus infected by intense inferiority complex and experiences mental trauma.

Then, a mysterious women, Ragini, befriends Srini and despite his damaged face, begins to love him. Srini marries Ragini. Eventually he starts to question whether Ragini is human, or a vampire in disguise.

Main characters
 Srinivasan - the protagonist
 Ragini - Srinivasan's wife/Mysterious women
 Chandrasekharan - Srinivasan's best friend
 Anandan - Srinivasan's neighbour
 Vjayalakshmi - Srinivasan's ex-girlfriend
 Vanaja - Srinivasan's student
 Kalyaniamma - Anandan’s wife
 Karthyayaniamma- Anandan’s servant
 Thankam - Chandrasekharan’s wife
 Professor Kurup - Sreenivasan’s colleague

References

External links 
 Yakshi from DC Books

1967 novels
Malayalam novels
Indian novels adapted into films
Novels by Malayattoor Ramakrishnan
Novels set in India
DC Books books
1967 Indian novels